The BMW N55 is a turbocharged straight-six petrol engine that began production in 2009. The N55 replaced the BMW N54 engine and was introduced in the F07 5 Series Gran Turismo.

The N55 was BMW's first straight-six engine to use a twin-scroll turbocharger. It also won three straight Ward's 10 Best Engines awards in 2011–2013.

Following the introduction of the BMW B58 engine in 2015, the N55 began to be phased out.

BMW S55 engine is a high performance version of the N55 made by BMW M GmbH, which is used by the F80 M3, F82 M4 and F87 M2 Competition/CS.

Design 
The main differences between the N55 and its N54 predecessor are the use of a single turbocharger, the addition of Valvetronic and the type of fuel injectors. Whilst the N54 used a twin-turbo arrangement, the newer N55 uses only a single twin scroll turbocharger. Valvetronic (variable valve lift)  is claimed to improve throttle response, low-rev torque, exhaust emissions and to reduce fuel consumption by 15%. The direct injection system uses solenoid-type injectors, instead of the piezo-type fuel injectors used by its N54 predecessor. The piezo injectors were more expensive and BMW decided they were not worthwhile outside of Europe, because the potential benefits of lean-burn operation could not be fully realised.

The exhaust manifold design, called Cylinder-bank Comprehensive Manifold (CCM) by BMW, aims to reduce the pressure fluctuations to reduce throttle lag and exhaust back-pressure. The twin-scroll turbocharger uses 2 sets of exhaust duct to turn 1 turbine wheel, with cylinders 1–3 and 4–6. The engine management system is Bosch MEVD 17.2, and compatible fuels are ROZ (RON) 91–98 octane (minimum RON 95 is recommended), 

Versions

N55B30M0 
Applications:
 2009–2017 F10/F11/F07 535i
 2010–2013 E90/E91/E92/E93 335i
 2010–2013 E82/E88 135i 
 2010–2017 F25 X3 xDrive35i
 2011–2013 E70 X5 xDrive 35i 
 2011–2015 F30/F31 335i
 2011–2014 E71 X6 xDrive 35i
 2012–2015 E84 X1 xDrive35i 
 2013–2016 F32/F33/F36 435i
 2014–2018 F15 X5 xDrive 35i
 2014–2019 F16 X6 xDrive35i
 2014–2016 F26 X4 xDrive 35i

N55B30 
Applications:
 2011–2018 F06/F12/F13 640i
 2012–2013 E82/E88 135is
 2012–2015 F20/F21 M135i
 2012–2015 F01/F02 740i/Li

N55B30O0 
Applications:
 2013–2016 F22/F23 M235i
 2015–2016 F20/F21 M135i LCI

N55HP 
Applications:
 2013–2015 F30 ActiveHybrid 3
 2011–2016 F10 ActiveHybrid 5

N55B30T0 
Applications:
 2016–2018 F87 M2 — 
 2015–2018 F26 X4 M40i —

Alpina 
Biturbo engine by Alpina based on the N55B30M0. The crankcase is of a different design and specially cast by BMW for Alpina.

301 kW version 
The N55R20A is Alpina's initial version of the N55, producing . The twin turbocharger system of the N54B30 is used, replacing the twin-scroll charging system originally applied.

Applications:
 2013–2017 Alpina F30 B3 Bi-Turbo
 2013–2017 Alpina F33/F34 B4 Bi-Turbo

324 kW version 
Applications:
 2017–present Alpina F30/F31 B3 S Bi-Turbo
 2017–present Alpina F32/F33 B4 S Bi-Turbo

332 kW version 
Application:

 2018–present Alpina F32/F33 B4 S Bi-Turbo Edition 99

S55 engine 

The S55 engine is the high performance version engine developed from the N55 engine by BMW M. It was introduced in the F80 M3, F82 M4 and later to the F87 M2 Competition/CS, replacing the BMW S65 naturally aspirated V8 engine used in the previous generation M3.

Differences compared with the N55 include a closed-deck engine block, lightweight crankshaft, different crankshaft bearings, strengthened pistons/rods, different springs/valve material, twin turbos, twin fuel pumps, active exhaust, revised cooling system and intercoolers.

–  version 
Applications:
 2020–present F87 M2 CS Racing

version 
Applications:
 2019–2021 F87 M2 Competition

version 
Applications:
 2014–2018 F80 M3
 2014–2020 F82/F83 M4

version 
Applications:
 2016–2018 F80 M3 with Competition package
 2016–2020 F82/F83 M4 with Competition package
2020–2021 F87 M2 CS

version 
Applications:
 2018 F80 M3 CS
 2017–2020 F82 M4 CS

version 

Applications:
 2015–2016 F82 M4 GTS
 2017 F82 M4 DTM Champion Edition

See also
 List of BMW engines

References

N55
Products introduced in 2009
Straight-six engines
Gasoline engines by model